Minuscule 22 (in the Gregory-Aland numbering), ε 288 (Soden), known also as Codex Colbertinus 2467. It is a Greek minuscule manuscript of the New Testament, written on vellum. Palaeographically it has been assigned to the 12th-century. Formerly it was assigned to the 11th-century (Tregelles, Scrivener). It has marginalia, it was adapted for liturgical use.

Description 

The codex contains a text of the four Gospels on 232 parchment leaves with some lacunae (Matthew 1:1-2:2; 4:19-5:25; John 14:22-16:27). The text is written in one column per page, 22 lines per page, in black ink, the initial letters in gold ink.

There is also another division according to the Ammonian Sections (in Matthew 355, in Mark 233), whose numbers are given at the margin, with references to the Eusebian Canons (partially). The references to the Eusebian Canons are incomplete.

In the 16th century lectionary markings were added at the margin (for liturgical use). The manuscript has a comment about the authenticity of Mark 16:9-20. The manuscript is free from errors of itacism and errors by "homoioteleuton", and very carefully accentuated. Some leaves are dislocated.

Text 

The Greek text of the codex is mixed. According to Streeter it is a representative of the Caesarean text-type, but according to Kurt Aland it has some the Byzantine text-type element, though it is not pure Byzantine manuscript. Aland did not place it in any of Categories of New Testament manuscripts. D. A. Black classified it as the Caesarean text. Alison Sarah Welsby has placed the manuscript in the textual family f1 in John, as an ancestor manuscript of Minuscule 1210.

According to the Claremont Profile Method it represents textual group 22b in Luke 1, Luke 10, and Luke 20 as a core member. Wisse listed 22, 134, 149, 351 (part), 1192, and 1210 as members of group 22b.

Matthew 10:12 (see Luke 10:5)
 It reads λεγοντες ειρηνη τω οικω τουτω (say peace to be this house) after αυτην. The reading was deleted by the first corrector, but the second corrector restored it. The reading is used by manuscripts: Codex Sinaiticus, Bezae, Regius, Washingtonianus, Koridethi, manuscripts of f 1, 1010 (1424), it, vgcl.

It has some remarkable readings. In Matthew 27:9 it has unique textual variant ἐπληρώθη τὸ ῥηθὲν διὰ Ζαχαρίου τοῦ προφήτου (fulfilled what was spoken by Zachariah the prophet). The reading is supported only by some Syriac manuscripts. Another manuscripts usually have "Jeremiah".

History 

The manuscript is dated by the INTF to the 12th-century.

It was added to the list of the New Testament manuscripts by Wettstein, who gave it the number 22. The manuscript was partially examined and collated by Scholz (only 96 verses), F. H. A. Scrivener, and C. R. Gregory. H. A. Sanders gave full a collation of the manuscript in 1914. It was examined and described by Paulin Martin. C. R. Gregory saw the manuscript in 1885.

It is currently housed at the Bibliothèque nationale de France (Gr. 72) at Paris.

See also 
 List of New Testament minuscules
 Textual criticism
 Biblical manuscript

References

Further reading

External links 

 Robert Waltz, Minuscule 22, Encyclopedia of Textual Criticism (2007)
 Online images of minuscule 22 (Digital Microfilm) at the National Library of France.
 Online images of minuscule 22 (Digital Microfilm) at the CSNTM.
 

Greek New Testament minuscules
12th-century biblical manuscripts
Bibliothèque nationale de France collections